Tokushima 1st district is a constituency of the House of Representatives in the Diet of Japan (national legislature). It is located in Tokushima Prefecture on the island of Shikoku, and consists of the city of Tokushima and the village of Sanagōchi in the Myōdō District. The district is among the least populated electoral districts in Japan and in the election of 2005 its voters had the highest electoral weight throughout Japan. The most populous district Tokyo 6 had 2.18 times the number of voters in Tokushima 1. As of 2012, 214,535 eligible voters were registered in the district.

The district was created in the electoral reform of 1994. Previously, all of Tokushima prefecture had formed one SNTV multi-member constituency (5 representatives) since 1947. The new district was used in the 1996 election for the first time.

Liberal Democrat Mamoru Fukuyama, former six-term member and president of the Tokushima prefectural assembly and secretary-general of the LDP prefectural federation, defeated Democrat Yoshito Sengoku in the 2012 Representatives election by almost 20,000 votes. Sengoku, a candidate for the Democratic Party of Japan (DPJ) and its 1996 precursor had won the district five times after its creation. Sengoku, a lawyer and University of Tokyo drop-out, had previously represented the Tokushima At-large district between 1990 and 1993 for the Socialist Party of Japan.

List of representatives

Election results

References 

Tokushima Prefecture
Districts of the House of Representatives (Japan)